Ismaikel "Mike" Perez (born 20 October 1985) is a Cuban-Irish professional boxer who holds the WBA Intercontinental Cruiserweight title and challenged once for the WBC cruiserweight title in 2017.

Background
Perez was a successful amateur boxer in Cuba. In 2005, while competing with the Cuban team at a tournament in Liverpool, he caught the eye of Irish boxing promoter Gary Hyde. Hyde later expressed his desire to turn Perez professional, and to do that he had to arrange his defection from Cuba. In December 2007, under cover of darkness, Perez swam offshore from Cuba, to a boat manned by a Mexican cartel. After transferring through two other boats, enduring storms and depleted food and water supplies, Perez eventually reached Mexican soil nine days later. The Cartel then held him there, until they secured final payment from organizer, Gary Hyde. Upon receiving it, Perez was released, allowing him to board a flight to his new home. On 10 January 2008, Perez touched down in Ireland, where he settled in Cork along with fellow Cubans Alexei Acosta and Luis García. Today, he fights under the nickname Mike "The Rebel" Perez, in reference to Cork which is known as the "Rebel County".

Amateur career
Perez had over 400 amateur bouts. In 2004, he won gold at the World Junior Championships in Jeju City, South Korea. The southpaw beat Englishman Danny Price in the semifinals, before defeating Russian fighter Nikolay Pavlyukov 38-16 in the final. Perez later beat fighters such as Kenneth Egan and Constantin Bejenaru, but moved up to 201 lbs and initially struggled against world class competition like Luis Ortiz, who beat him in 2006 to become the Cuban national champion. Perez avenged that loss in the 2007 championships, but lost to Osmay Acosta in that year's final.

Professional career

Early career
In 2008, Perez turned professional under Cuban coach Nicholas Cruz Hernández, who had also moved to Ireland in 1988.

On 7 May 2011, Perez won the International Prizefighter tournament, held in London, England. Perez faced Kertson Manswell and Grégory Tony, before defeating American Tye Fields in the final to take home the £32,000 prize. After the fight, Perez stated the victory would earn him a world title shot in the near future.

He then fought and won against American journeyman Zack Page in a rematch on 9 November 2011, in York Hall, Bethnal Green, London.

Perez made his United States debut on 30 December 2011, against the Nigerian heavyweight Friday Ahunanya. The location for the fight was Morongo Casino, Resort & Spa, Cabazon, California. Perez won by unanimous decision, winning every round on the judges' scorecards.

After a hiatus in 2012, Perez returned to the ring on 4 May 2013, winning a 10-round unanimous decision against American Travis Walker on the undercard of Wladimir Klitschko vs. Francesco Pianeta.

Perez vs. Abdusalomov and aftermath
On 2 November 2013, he made his HBO debut against hard-hitting prospect Magomed Abdusalomov (18-0 18 KOs) at Madison Square Garden. In a rare southpaw vs. southpaw heaveyweight match, Perez won by unanimous decision after a brutally-fought 10 rounds. The fight left Abdusalamov permanently and severely injured after suffering a stroke during surgery to remove a blood clot in his brain. Abdusalamov's family later sued the New York State Athletic Commission due to negligence. The lawsuit ended with a $22 million settlement. Perez's form dipped after the tragic incident, as he drew and lost many of his next fights. He would later reveal that he struggled with alcoholism during this time, to the point of getting into the ring drunk a few times.

Perez returned on 18 January 2014 to fight Carlos Takam at the Bell Centre in Montreal. Takam and Perez fought to a majority draw. The fight was shown on HBO on the Jean Pascal vs Lucian Bute under card.

Perez then lost a narrow split decision to Bryant Jennings on 26 July 2014, with the judges’ scorecards reading 114-113 and 115-112 for Jennings, and 114-113 for Perez. Referee Harvey Dock controversially deducted a point from Perez in the final round for hitting Jennings on the break.

On 22 May 2015 Perez was brutally knocked out by Alexander Povetkin 91 seconds into a WBC heavyweight title eliminator. Following the loss to Povetkin, Perez spent over two years away from the ring, before returning in 2017 as a cruiserweight.

World Boxing Super Series

On 6 July, Perez was announced as the final entrant to the cruiserweight World Boxing Super Series (WBSS).

Perez vs. Briedis
At the Draft Gala, which took place on 8 July in Monte Carlo, Perez was chosen by WBC champion Mairis Briedis as his quarter final opponent. On 22 July, the WBSS announced the fight would take place in Briedis' home country of Latvia at the Riga Arena, Riga, on 30 September 2017. This would be the 8th time Briedis would fight at his hometown arena.

Briedis won a scrappy fight, beating Perez by unanimous decision after 12 rounds (116-110, 115-111, 114-112). Perez was deducted a point in round 3 following an accidental clash of heads. Briedis was also docked a point during round 10 for excessive holding. With the win, Briedis moved on to the semi-finals to face the eventual winner Oleksandr Usyk.

Perez vs. Salam 
In his next bout, Perez fought Tony Salam. Perez won the fight via third round TKO.

Personal life
Perez resides in Cork, Ireland with his wife Camille.

Professional boxing record

{|class="wikitable" style="text-align:center"
|-
!
!Result
!Record
!Opponent
!Type
!Round, time
!Date
!Location
!Notes
|-
|30
|Win
|26–3–1
|align=left| Jose Gregorio Ulrich
|TKO
|6 (10), 
|13 Nov 2021
|align=left| 
|align=left|
|-
|29
|Win
|25–3–1
|align=left| Tony Salam
|KO
|4 (12), 
|13 Aug 2021
|align=left| 
|align=left|
|-
|28
|Win
|24–3–1
|align=left| Keith Tapia
|UD
|10
|20 Oct 2018
|align=left| 
|align=left|
|-
|27
|Win
|23–3–1
|align=left| Pablo Matias Magrini
|TKO
|1 (8), 
|17 Feb 2018
|align=left| 
|
|-
|26
|Loss
|22–3–1
|align=left| Mairis Briedis
|UD
|12
|30 Sep 2017
|align=left| 
|align=left|
|-
|25
|Win
|22–2–1
|align=left| Viktor Biscak
|KO
|1 (6), 
|10 Jun 2017
|align=left| 
|
|-
|24
|Loss
|21–2–1
|align=left| Alexander Povetkin
|KO
|1 (12), 
|22 May 2015
|align=left|
|align=left|
|-
|23
|Win
|21–1–1
|align=left| Darnell Wilson
|TKO
|2 (8), 
|5 Feb 2015
|align=left|
|
|-
|22
|Loss
|20–1–1
|align=left| Bryant Jennings
|
|12
|26 Jul 2014
|align=left|
|
|-
|21
|Draw
|20–0–1
|align=left| Carlos Takam
|
|10
|18 Jan 2014
|align=left|
|
|-
|20
|Win
|20–0
|align=left| Magomed Abdusalamov
|UD
|10
|2 Nov 2013
|align=left|
|align=left|
|-
|19
|Win
|19–0
|align=left| Travis Walker
|UD
|10
|4 May 2013
|align=left|
|
|-
|18
|Win
|18–0
|align=left| Friday Ahunanya
|UD
|10
|30 Dec 2011
|align=left|
|
|-
|17
|Win
|17–0
|align=left| Zack Page
|PTS
|8
|9 Nov 2011
|align=left|
|
|-
|16
|Win
|16–0
|align=left| Tye Fields
|TKO
|1 (3), 
|7 May 2011
|align=left|
|align=left|
|-
|15
|Win
|15–0
|align=left| Grégory Tony
|TKO
|1 (3), 
|7 May 2011
|align=left|
|align=left|
|- align=center
|14
|Win
|14–0
|align=left| Kertson Manswell
|
|3
|7 May 2011
|align=left|
|align=left|
|-
|13
|Win
|13–0
|align=left| Ismail Abdoul
|PTS
|8
|4 Mar 2011
|align=left|
|
|-
|12
|Win
|12–0
|align=left| Pāvels Dolgovs
|TKO
|1 (6), 
|6 Nov 2010
|align=left|
|
|-
|11
|Win
|11–0
|align=left| Jason Barnett
|KO
|1 (8), 
|26 Jun 2010
|align=left|
|
|-
|10
|Win
|10–0
|align=left| Tomas Mrazek
|TKO
|3 (4), 
|15 May 2010
|align=left|
|
|-
|9
|Win
|9–0
|align=left| Edgars Kalnārs
|TKO
|1 (4), 
|15 May 2010
|align=left|
|
|-
|8
|Win
|8–0
|align=left| Zack Page
|PTS
|8
|28 Feb 2009
|align=left|
|
|-
|7
|Win
|7–0
|align=left| Harry Duiven Jr
|KO
|2 (6), 
|17 Jan 2009
|align=left|
|
|-
|6
|Win
|6–0
|align=left| Luis Oscar Ricail
|TKO
|1 (6), 
|26 Oct 2008
|align=left|
|
|-
|5
|Win
|5–0
|align=left| Claudemir Dias
|
|1 (8), 
|13 Sep 2008
|align=left|
|
|- 
|4
|Win
|4–0
|align=left| Howard Daley
|TKO
|1 (4), 
|12 Apr 2008
|align=left|
|
|-
|3
|Win
|3–0
|align=left| Tomasz Zeprzalka
|
|6
|22 Mar 2008
|align=left|
|
|- 
|2
|Win
|2–0
|align=left| Sándor Balogh
|TKO
|1 (4), 
|2 Feb 2008
|align=left|
|
|-
|1
|Win
|1–0
|align=left| Jevgēņijs Stamburskis
|
|1 (4), 
|26 Jan 2008
|align=left|
|

References

External links

Bleacher Report - The Top 10 Heavyweight Prospects in the World
Mike Perez - Profile, News Archive & Current Rankings at Box.Live

Heavyweight boxers
Southpaw boxers
Living people
Cuban emigrants to Ireland
1985 births
Prizefighter contestants
Cuban male boxers
People from Sancti Spíritus